The Somalia national beach soccer team represents Somalia in international beach soccer competitions and is controlled by the SFF, the governing body for professional football in Somalia.

Current squad
Correct as of July 2009

{{Fs player|no=10|nat=|pos=FW|name=Abdulkadir Khadar

Coach: Ahmed Mohamed Ahmed

Achievements
 GE Money Beach Soccer Tour African Game vs. Senegal

See also
Somalia national football team
Somali Football Federation
Somalia League
Somalia Cup

External links

http://www.somaliabeachsoccer.com

National sports teams of Somalia
Football in Somalia
African national beach soccer teams